Events in the year 1944 in India.

Incumbents
 Emperor of India – George VI
 Viceroy of India – The Viscount Wavell

Events
 National income - 76,509 million
 March to June – Operation U-Go; Japanese defeated in Manipur.
 8 March – 3 July - Battle of Imphal against Operation U-Go.
 20-26 March – Battle of Sangshak
 4 April – 22 June - Battle of Kohima
 14 April - INA hoisted the Indian tricolour for the first time on mainland India at Moirang in Manipur.
 14 April – Bombay Explosion (1944)
 5 May – Mohandas Gandhi released

Law
Public Debt Act
Cocoanut Committee Act
Central Excises and Salt Act

Births
11 January
 Shibu Soren, politician and Chief Minister of Jharkhand.
 Jagdish Tytler, politician.
18 February - Gurmeet Bawa, folk singer (died 2021)
23 February - J. C. Diwakar Reddy, politician and member of parliament from Anantapur.
9 April – Ronen Sen, diplomat and ambassador to the United States of America.
1 May – Suresh Kalmadi, politician and businessman.
1 June - Mekapati Rajamohan Reddy, politician and former member of parliament from Nellore.
23 August – Saira Banu, actress.
1 September – C. M. Gupta, scientist.
3 November – Debasis Mitra, mathematician.
8 December – Sharmila Tagore, actress.

Deaths
22 February – Kasturba Gandhi, wife of Mohandas Karamchand Gandhi (born 1869).
 9 November – C. N. Lakshmikanthan, Tamil film journalist

References

 
India
Years of the 20th century in India
India in World War II